A variant form may refer to:

 Variant Chinese character
 Variant form (Unicode)
 an alternative spelling. See, for example:
 American and British English spelling differences
 British and Malaysian English differences
 Orthographical variant (in biology)